The Bunun Leisure Farm or Bunun Tribal Leisure Farm is a recreational farm about Bunun people in Taoyuan Village, Yanping Township, Taitung County, Taiwan.

History
The farm area used to be the cluster area of Bunun people to live. In 1985, the Bunun Foundation was established by Mr. and Mrs. Bai Kwan-sheng, and subsequently the Bunun Leisure Farm was built.

Activities
Various activities from livestock feeding, vegetables plucking etc. can be done in the farm. Daily Bunun traditional shows are also performed at the farm.

Facilities
The farm features 68 suits of accommodation with Bunun exterior architectural style. It also has theater, studio, art center, coffee shop, restaurants, park etc.

See also
 List of tourist attractions in Taiwan

References

External links

  

1985 establishments in Taiwan
Buildings and structures completed in 1985
Buildings and structures in Taitung County
Farms in Taiwan
Tourist attractions in Taitung County